The Wacky Hi-Jinks of Adrenalin O.D. is the debut album by hardcore punk band Adrenalin O.D. It was released in 1984 through the band's own label Buy Our Records.

The album is celebrated as being one of the most ridiculous albums in punk and one of Adrenalin O.D.'s best efforts. It is known for its speed, sense of humor and sarcastic lyrics that satirize middle-class suburban living.

The album was later reissued in 2008 on Chunksaah Records.

Track listing

Personnel
 Lead vocals, guitar - Paul Richard
 Guitar, vocals - Bruce Wingate
 Bass, vocals - Jack Steeples
 Drums, vocals - Dave Scott

Production
 Engineered by Vito C
 Produced by Adrenalin O.D.

References

1984 debut albums
Adrenalin O.D. albums